= Chandanhosur =

- Village
- Country: India
- State: Karnataka
- District: Belgaum
- Talukas: Belgaum

Population (2010)
  - Total: 2,200

Languages
  - Official: Kannada
- Time zone: UTC+5:30 (IST)
- Postal code: 590020

Chandanhosur is a village in Belgaum district in the southern state of Karnataka, India.with approximate population of 2400
